Jubel or Jubël may refer to:

Literature
Jubel, a 1995 Norwegian novel by Lars Saabye Christensen

Music
 "Jubel", several compositions by Carl Maria von Weber
 "Jubel" (song), by Klingande, 2013
 Jubël (duo), a Swedish band

Other uses
 Front for Socialism and Democracy/Benno Jubël, a political party in Senegal

See also

Jubilee (disambiguation)